Apsley railway station is in Apsley, on the southern outskirts of Hemel Hempstead, Hertfordshire, England. One of two railway stations now serving the town, the other is Hemel Hempstead just up the line in Boxmoor.

Apsley is managed and train services are operated by London Northwestern Railway.

History

The station was designed by the architect William Henry Hamlyn and opened on 26 September 1938, to serve the paper producing area of Apsley Mill and Nash Mill, it was operated initially by the London, Midland and Scottish Railway. The station then passed on to the London Midland Region of British Railways on nationalisation in 1948.

When Sectorisation was introduced in the 1980s, the station was served by Network SouthEast 
until the Privatisation of British Railways.

Services
All services at Apsley are operated by London Northwestern Railway.

The typical off-peak service in trains per hour is:
 2 tph to London Euston
 2 tph to 

During the peak hours, a number of additional services between London Euston,  and  call at the station.

Notes

References

External links

 Station on navigable O.S. map.

Dacorum
Railway stations in Hertfordshire
DfT Category E stations
Former London, Midland and Scottish Railway stations
Railway stations in Great Britain opened in 1938
Railway stations served by West Midlands Trains
William Henry Hamlyn buildings
Stations on the West Coast Main Line